Óli á Hrauni ("Óli on a lava field") is an Icelandic television talk show hosted by Ólafur Hannesson and distributed by ÍNN. The show features interviews with politicians, other notable people, and members of the public. It premiered on March 28, 2008. The show has been taped at the HQ of ÍNN from the start.

At the start of season 3 the show added a new co-host, Viðar Helgi Guðjohnsen, to its staff.

Among those who have appeared on the show are:
Einar Kristinn Guðfinnsson, former Icelandic Minister of Fisheries and Agriculture
Þórunn Sveinbjarnardóttir, Icelandic Minister for the Environment
Ómar Ragnarsson, entertainer
Gunnar B. Guðmundsson, director
Geir Jón Þórisson, police officer
Björgvin G. Sigurðsson, Icelandic Minister for Business
Ragnheiður Elín Árnadóttir, Icelandic Senator
Lára Ómarsdóttir, reporter
Kristján L. Möller, Icelandic Minister of Communications
Bjarni Benediktsson, Jr., leader of the Icelandic Independence Party

References 

  
  
 ÍNN

2008 Icelandic television series debuts
Icelandic-language television shows
2000s Icelandic television series
2010s Icelandic television series